Dichrorampha sequana is a species of moth belonging to the family Tortricidae.

Synonym:
 Tortrix sequana Hübner, 1799 (= basionym)

References

Grapholitini
Moths described in 1799